Jesús Miguel Valentín Rodríguez (born 15 October 1991), is a Spanish footballer who plays as a central defender for Recreativo de Huelva.

Club career
Born in Las Américas, Santa Cruz de Tenerife, Canary Islands, Valentín started playing as a senior with local UD Ibarra. In 2012, he moved to UD Las Palmas, being assigned to the reserves in the Tercera División.

On 13 July 2014 Jesús signed a three-year professional deal, being definitely promoted to the main squad. He made his first-team debut on 11 September, starting in a 2–0 away win against RCD Mallorca, in the season's Copa del Rey.

Valentín made his league debut on 1 March 2015, starting in a 1–1 home draw against CD Tenerife in the Segunda División. On 25 August he was loaned to fellow league team SD Huesca, in a season-long deal.

Valentín scored his first professional goal on 13 March 2016, netting the game's only in a home success against AD Alcorcón. On 7 July, he rescinded his contract with Las Palmas and signed a permanent three-year deal with Huesca four days later.

On 3 January 2017, Valentín was transferred to fellow league team Real Zaragoza. On 31 January of the following year, he signed for Córdoba CF in the same division.

On 31 January 2019, Valentín terminated his contract with the Blanquiverdes, and moved to third division side Recreativo de Huelva just hours later. On 4 July, he signed for CF Rayo Majadahonda, freshly relegated to division three.

References

External links

1991 births
Living people
People from Tenerife
Sportspeople from the Province of Santa Cruz de Tenerife
Footballers from the Canary Islands
Spanish footballers
Association football defenders
Segunda División players
Segunda División B players
Tercera División players
Divisiones Regionales de Fútbol players
UD Las Palmas Atlético players
UD Las Palmas players
SD Huesca footballers
Real Zaragoza players
Córdoba CF players
Recreativo de Huelva players
CF Rayo Majadahonda players